"Now You're Gone" is a song performed by Swedish dance musician Basshunter in cooperation with DJ Mental Theo's Bazzheadz. The single uses the same music as "Boten Anna", Basshunter's major European hit in 2006, but its lyrics, performed in English by Sebastian Westwood, are completely different.

The song was covered by Crazy Frog as "Everyone", on his third studio album. It has also been parodied by former BBC Radio 1 host, Chris Moyles.

Background

In 2007, DJ Mental Theo used the "Boten Anna" instrumental to create a bootleg English-language version for his DJ sets in Magaluf, Mallorca. It was this song that eventually became released as a single.

The song's theme is different from "Boten Anna"; "Boten Anna" is about an IRC bot, and "Now You're Gone" is about a young couple breaking up. The music video expands on this theme, although it suggests a reunion of the couple, which is not referenced in the song itself. The tempo of the song has also been increased compared to "Boten Anna".

Critical reception

Nick Levine from Digital Spy said that song has throbbing trance beats, arms-aloft chorus and pleasing hint of electropop which conjures up images of a dirty Swedish raver. Editor Michaelangelo Matos from the American website Idolator, as part of the Project X series, discussed the songs from the top ten of the chart from the second week of February 2008 of the British charts. Referring to the first from the list "Now You're Gone", he stated that the vocals and the house beat are very aggressive and are not suitable for American listeners. Jocke Sandström for Sundsvalls Tidning said that there are no words or grades to justify "Now You're Gone" and said that this is the song for people who have not yet discovered music. In 2019 during concert Jingle Bell Ball Tom Walker performed a Christmassy rendition of "Now You're Gone". In 2020 song was included at number 39 in The Top 50 Greatest High Street Club Bangers of All Time by Vice.

Chart performance 
"Now You're Gone" peaked at number one the UK Singles Chart in January 2008. The single remained at the top spot for five weeks before being knocked off by Duffy's "Mercy" which also achieved a five-week run at the number one of the UK Singles Chart in 2008. "Now You're Gone" became Britain's eight-best-selling single of 2008, selling 347,008 copies in first quarter of 2008 alone. As of 2018, the single has sold 667,000 copies. The song also topped the chart in Ireland where it became fourth-best-selling single of 2008. In Sweden, "Now You're Gone" debuted at number 43 on Swedish singles chart on 10 January 2008, eventually peaking at two on 21 February.

"Now You're Gone" entered the New Zealand singles chart at number 25 on 8 September 2008 reaching a peak of three after 14 weeks, on 15 December 2008. The single was the 14th-best-selling single of 2008 and 35th-best-selling single of 2009. It was certified Platinum for sales of 15,000 copies. In France "Now You're Gone" debuted at number 6 on 10 May 2008 and held this position for 3 weeks. In the United States song charted on Dance/Electronic Digital Song Sales and peaked at number 45.

Music video
The video was shot in Oslo. The Iranian model Aylar Lie plays the female lead in the music video of the song. Lucas Thorheim is the male actor. The other two girls that are with Aylar Lie are Silje Lian (who is in the pink top before she gets changed) and Marielle Mathiassen.

The music video expands on the song's theme of a young man and a woman ending their relationship, depicting the couple breaking up over SMS text messages. At the end of the video, the couple kiss, but the lyrics do not follow this event.

To date the video has experienced massive success on Internet video hosting site YouTube, where the video has reached over 300 million views over uploads of the music video on the Hard2Beat and Ultra Music video channels.

Track listing
2-track CD single
"Now You're Gone" (Radio Edit) – 2:34
"Now You're Gone" (DJ Alex Extended Mix) – 5:42

CD maxi single
"Now You're Gone" (Radio Edit) – 2:34
"Now You're Gone" (Video Edit) – 2:39
"Now You're Gone" (DJ Alex Extended Mix) – 5:42
"Now You're Gone" (Sound Selektaz Remix) – 5:35
"Now You're Gone" (Fonzerelli Remix) – 6:27
"Now You're Gone" (Video)

Australian and German CD single / Brazilian digital download
"Now You're Gone" (Radio Edit) – 2:36
"Now You're Gone" (DJ Alex Extended Mix) – 5:45
"Now You're Gone" (Sound Selektaz Remix) – 5:38
"Now You're Gone" (Fonzerelli Remix) – 6:29
"Boten Anna" (Radio Edit) – 3:30

Charts

Weekly charts

Year-end charts

Decade-end charts

Certifications

Awards

See also
 List of UK Singles Chart number ones of the 2000s
 List of UK Dance Singles Chart number ones of 2008
 List of UK Singles Downloads Chart number ones of the 2000s
 List of best-selling singles of the 2000s (decade) in the United Kingdom
 List of Platinum singles in the United Kingdom awarded since 2000
 List of number-one singles of 2008 (Ireland)
 List of best-selling singles and albums of 2008 in Ireland
 New Zealand top 50 singles of 2008
 New Zealand top 50 singles of 2009
 List of number-one dance airplay hits of 2008 (U.S.)

Notes

References

External links
 
 

2007 songs
2007 singles
2008 singles
Basshunter songs
Irish Singles Chart number-one singles
Number-one singles in Scotland
UK Singles Chart number-one singles
Songs written by Basshunter
Songs about loneliness
Warner Music Sweden singles
Song recordings produced by Basshunter